The Advanced Soaring Concepts Spirit, also called the Advanced Soaring Concepts American Spirit, is an American mid-wing, T-tailed. single-seat, FAI Standard Class glider that was designed by Tor Jensen and produced by Advanced Soaring Concepts, first flying in 1992. The aircraft was produced in kit form for amateur construction.

Design and development
The Spirit was the Standard Class design that paralleled the company's FAI 15-Metre Class Falcon.

The aircraft is made from a welded steel tubing, with an Aramid reinforced cockpit section. Its  span wing employs a Carbon-fiber-reinforced polymer spar and carbon sandwich construction. The kit came with pre-molded fiberglass parts.

Specifications (Spirit)

See also

References

Glider aircraft
Homebuilt aircraft
1990s United States sailplanes
Aircraft first flown in 1992